Pacific Edge Limited is a cancer diagnostics New Zealand company that offers a genetic biomarker based suite of bladder cancer diagnostic tools. The company has offices in Hershey, USA, and its head office in Dunedin, New Zealand. Pacific Edge is listed on the New Zealand NZX main board stock exchange under ticker code PEB, and forms part of the NZX 50 Index.

History
Established in August 2001, Pacific Edge uses genetic biomarkers in urine to detect the presence of cancer. They market themselves as being a third less expensive than other diagnostic tools.

They provide a diagnostic service through their facilities in New Zealand and the United States, as well as selected partners in Europe and Australia.

The firm is listed on the New Zealand NZX index. They have had a number of capital raises, most recently in 2013 and 2015 to pursue commercialisation of their diagnostic tests in the USA.

In June 2020, Pacific Edge secured a commercial relationship with Kaiser Permanente, one of the largest health insurance providers in the US, for its bladder cancer tests.

Products
Pacific Edge's suite of tests for bladder cancer are called CxBladder, with specialist subtype products to detect cancerous cells and provide triage for clinicians and oncologists. Their tests samples are non-invasive urine test based on RNA and protein assays, with high sensitivity and earlier detection than other forms of bladder cancer diagnostics like cytology.

Awards
Pacific Edge has won a number of awards, including:

The NZ Innovators Award 2013
NZBIO Biotech company of the year award 2014
 Medical Technology Association of New Zealand Innovation Award 2016

References

External links
 Official site

Urology organizations
New Zealand brands
Companies listed on the New Zealand Exchange
Companies based in Dunedin
Companies established in 2001
Medical technology companies of New Zealand
New Zealand companies established in 2001